Volleyball at the 2015 Southeast Asian Games was held at the OCBC Arena Hall 3, in Kallang, Singapore from 10 to 16 June 2015.

Participating nations
A total of 180 athletes from eight nations competed in volleyball at the 2015 Southeast Asian Games:

Draw
The draw ceremony for the team sports was held on 15 April 2015 at Singapore City.

Men's
The teams were distributed according to their position at the 2015 Southeast Asian Games using the serpentine system for their distribution.

Group A

Group B

 (Host)

Women's
The teams were distributed according to their position at the 2015 Southeast Asian Games using the serpentine system for their distribution.

Group A
 (Host)
 

Group B

Medalists

Medal table

Final standing

Men

The 2015 men's volleyball tournament was the 28th edition of the event. It was held in OCBC Arena Hall 2, Singapore from 10 to 16 June 2015.

Squads

Results
All times are Singapore Standard Time (UTC+08:00)

Preliminary round

Group A

|}

Group B

|}

Final round

Semifinals

|}

Gold medal match

|}

Final standing

Women

The 2015 women's volleyball tournament was the 28th edition of the event. It was held in OCBC Arena Hall 2, Singapore from 10 to 15 June 2015. Thailand defeated Vietnam to claim the gold medal.

Squads

Results
All times are Singapore Standard Time (UTC+08:00)

Preliminary round

Group A

|}

Group B

|}

Final round

Semifinals

|}

Gold medal match

|}

Final standing

References

External links
  
 

2015
2015 Southeast Asian Games events
Southeast Asian Games
Kallang